A Comp Check (also known as a "look-up") is a request made to a State Licensed or Certified real estate appraiser, sometimes to assure a minimum opinion of value before an order (typically for lending purposes), is placed. Because providing an opinion of value is the definition of an appraisal in the United States, the practice of the look-up, when excess care is not taken, runs a greater risk of being in violation of the Uniform Standards of Professional Appraisal Practice (USPAP) than an assignment with a more thorough Scope of Work.

Standard practices
Due to the Financial Institutions Reform, Recovery, and Enforcement Act of 1989 (FIRREA), licensed and certified real estate appraisers in the United States who are involved in a federally related transaction are required to follow federally accepted, uniform standards, known as USPAP, which are promulgated by the Appraisal Standards Board (ASB) of the Appraisal Foundation.  In the Appraisal Foundation's "Advisory Opinion 19" (AO-19)  the Appraisal Foundation makes clear the following:
"An appraiser must perform assignments ethically and competently, in accordance with USPAP and any supplemental standards applicable to the assignment. An appraiser must not engage in criminal conduct. An appraiser must perform assignments with impartiality, objectivity, and independence, and without accommodation of personal interests."
An appraiser must not accept an assignment that includes the reporting of predetermined opinions and conclusions, and further, the Management section of the Ethics Rule in USPAP states:
"It is unethical for an appraiser to accept an assignment, or to have a compensation arrangement for an assignment, that is contingent on any of the following:
The reporting of a predetermined result (e.g., opinion of value);
A direction in assignment results that favors the cause of the client;
The amount of a value opinion;
The attainment of a stipulated result; or
The occurrence of a subsequent event directly related to the appraiser’s opinions and specific to the assignment’s purpose."

State laws
Because most comp checks are not intended for use in a federally related transaction, the federal laws requiring the uniform standards (USPAP) to be adhered to do not apply.  However, the several states and the territories that make up the union have written into their own professional licensing standards for real estate appraisers that, in most cases, a licensed or certified real estate appraiser, when providing a value for real property, is required by statute or regulation to be in compliance with USPAP.

In the appraisal of real property and within the context of individual state laws, there are two types of "comp checks" that can be done ethically and legally.  Neither are practical.  The first takes place when a mortgage broker calls an appraiser and asks for the range of sale prices in a particular neighborhood, without describing a subject property.  In this case, the appraiser can provide a list of sales in the project, with a brief description, and the range of sale prices in the project, without comparison and without discussion of a specific value.  In this way the appraiser avoids completing an appraisal on a subject property and provides a consultation service instead.  However, the mortgage broker rarely accepts this as helpful and will typically insist on more specific results.  Therefore, many appraisers will not provide this service as they feel it can be construed as misleading, the broker only hearing what he wants to hear.

Alternatives
The alternative and legal "comp check" is not a comp check at all but an appraisal.  If an appraiser believes a value for a particular property can be reliably determined without leaving the office and inspecting the property, and that the necessary approaches to value to determine a reliable opinion can be completed from a desk, an appraiser can accept the "comp check" as an appraisal request, and provide an opinion of value for a subject property verbally.  An engagement letter (i.e., a detailed order identifying the user and the use of a request) for such an assignment is necessary, and a written workfile with a signed certification must be maintained by the appraiser on this report, even if the results are verbally reported.  This workfile must contain all data necessary to support the opinion of value provided.  Such an appraisal is wrought with liabilities and the competent appraiser will refuse any such assignment unless the house being appraised and its immediate market are very well known by the appraiser.  Because any such report would have to be made based on extraordinary assumptions in regards to condition and quality of the house, the appraiser, even when the area and subject property are well known, is wise to make such a report based on the hypothetical condition that an inspection was made, and the report "subject to a physical inspection" open to change should differences in assumptions be observed. Most of the better appraisers will not complete this type of an assignment, even if they are very familiar with the area, because there is more work to it than meets the eye and brokers expect it free of charge. What most mortgage brokers do not realize, however, is that a comp search appraisal will often not fit their needs, as an appraisal for lending purposes with a different scope of work can reasonably result in a significantly different value, and the direction of the difference is not predictable.

For a mortgage broker or loan officer, the best alternative to the "comp check" is simply asking the owner to be realistic in what they believe their house is worth and work with those numbers.  Brokers will collect payment for the appraisal up front plus a reasonable application fee and, if the owner was unrealistic about the value of his/her home and it adversely affects the ability for the owner to obtain financing, neither the broker nor the appraiser can be construed as being at fault.

Concerns

One of the biggest concerns for appraisers, when it comes to "comp checks" is that mortgage brokers and loan officers who call with such requests are actually "appraiser shopping".  Many people are of the opinion that appraisers come in two types: aggressive and conservative.  This is a misnomer.  If there are two types of appraisers in a lending appraisal assignment, they are "Honest, Competent Market Value Appraisers" and everyone else.  A mortgage broker and or lender is advised to shop for a new appraiser when they find they are working with someone other than the honest and competent Market Value Appraiser.

References

Real estate in the United States